The Körber Foundation (German: Körber-Stiftung) is a nonprofit organization, established in 1959 by German businessman Kurt A. Körber. It provides a platform to discuss present political topics and develops operational projects on social and political issues. Its agenda is focused on key areas of European foreign policy in the Middle East and in Eastern Europe, Russia and the CIS. The foundation pursues this agenda with four discussion fora: Bergedorf Round Table, Körber Dialogue Middle East, Political Breakfasts, and Körber Network Foreign Policy.

The organization has its headquarters in Hamburg and maintains an international relations department in Berlin. Since the death of the company founder in 1992, it is the sole shareholder of Körber AG.

Bergedorf Round Table 
Chaired by former German president Richard von Weizsäcker, the Bergedorf Round Table is a confidential, two-day gathering with around thirty participants that is held three times a year. Since 1961 it has promoted international dialogue between the realms of politics, science, business and society, focussing on the dialogue between policy-makers, diplomats and experts in international relations. More than 2,000 politicians and experts – among them Pope John Paul II, Vladimir Putin, Helmut Kohl and Helmut Schmidt – have participated at one or more of 139 Bergedorf Round Tables.

Except for short statements to kick off the discussion, participants do not report prepared speeches, but intervene spontaneously. The discussions take place at venues where the topic under discussion is immediate and tangible. Participants come from Germany, other member states of the EU, from the US and from the region which is concerned. Following the conference a summary is sent to the participants and foreign policy-makers. Every Bergedorf Round Table is published as a protocol in German and English. To ensure confidentiality, the participants edit their contributions before publication.

Körber Dialogue Middle East 
Three times a year, the Körber Dialogue Middle East provides a platform for multilateral discussions on topical issues of foreign and security policy in the Middle East. Around ten foreign policy experts from the EU, the US and the Middle East hold discussions and formulate policy recommendations. The inclusion of Iranian representatives into these discussions is given particular importance. The conference venue is either Istanbul or Berlin.

Eustory History Campus 
The EUSTORY History Campus constitutes a platform for young participants from Europe and its adjacent neighborhood interested in engaging in an informed and critical dialogue with peers on questions of history. The platform features a public section that comprises short articles and essays pertaining to European history and culture. In addition to this, the platform also offers seminars and workshops focusing on specific themes. In 2021, at the occasion of the 30th anniversary of the dissolution of the USSR, the platform implemented the digital programme "Phantom Pasts or Everyday Present?". Within the framework of the project participants aged 18–24 from 13 countries explored the material(ized) remains of the socialist past in the context of their own home towns and visualized their collected materials online with the help of an art curator, a memory researcher and a photographer who facilitated the process. The resulting multimedia zine reflects the participants' "personal journeys through the material enmeshment of the socialist past in a quest of highlighting its ambivalence and complexity".

Political Breakfasts 
Political Breakfasts in Berlin are high-level and confidential background discussions which seek to help cultivate foreign policy discourse in the German capital. The speakers include presidents, foreign ministers and other high-level political officials from abroad. They have the opportunity to discuss issues with a small group of senior foreign policy decision makers from the Bundestag, the Federal Foreign Office, the Federal Chancellery, the Ministry of Defence, other agencies and selected think tanks.

Körber Network Foreign Policy 
Since 2005, the Körber Network Foreign Policy has assembled a group of young foreign policy professionals from the German Bundestag, the Federal Chancellery, the Federal Foreign Office, the Ministry of Defence and selected foreign embassies in Berlin. The Network's members, who are invited on the basis of personal recommendations, explore challenges facing European foreign policy. Once a month, they speak in confidential discussions with foreign politicians and advisors over dinner at the Körber Foundation's Berlin Office.

Once a year, the group takes a field trip to gain personal experience with focal points of international politics. Participants meet senior representatives of governments and international organizations, as well as people active on the ground – in peace-keeping missions, military structures, and major economic projects. Field trips were organised to Kosovo and Belgrade in 2005, to Georgia (including Abkhazia) in 2006 and to Iran in 2007.

Criticism 
Connections between Körber Foundation and politics have been described as too close by some media. A history contest, organized by the foundation, has been under the patronage of the President of Germany. Government politicians have been members of advisory councils for foundation awards and similar activities. According to critics, such connections violate guidelines of the World Health Organization (WHO) regarding the relations between governments and tobacco industry. However, affected politicians have pointed out the foundation's reputation and the social value of its projects.

References

External links 
 (koerber-stiftung.de)

International conferences in Germany
Non-profit organisations based in Hamburg
Political organisations based in Germany
Organizations established in 1959